Nobuo (written: , , , , ,  in hiragana or  in katakana) is a masculine, Japanese given name. Notable people with the name include:

, Japanese basketball player
Nobuo Fujita (1911–1997), Warrant Flying Officer of the Imperial Japanese Navy
, Japanese basketball player
, Japanese basketball player
 Nobuo Kojima (1915–2006), writer
 Kanda Nobuo (1921–2003), historian who specialized in early 
 Nobuo Nakagawa (1905–1984), film director
, Japanese actor
, Japanese boxer
 Nobuo Okishio (1927–2003), Japanese economist
, Japanese handball player
 Nobuo Satō (born 1942), former Japanese figure skater and current coach
, Japanese sculptor
 Nobuo Suga, a Japanese biologist, known for hearing research
 Nobuo Tanaka (born 1950), former executive director of the International Energy Agency
 Paul Nobuo Tatsuguchi (1911–1943), war participant
 Nobuo Tobita (born 1959), Japanese voice actor
 Nobuo Uematsu (born 1959), composer of video game music
 Nobuo Yoneda (1930–1996), mathematician and computer scientist

See also
 Ina Nobuo Award, an annual award given by Nikon Salon

Japanese masculine given names